A constitutional referendum was held in Palau on 5 November 1996, alongside the general elections. Voters were whether they approved of two changes to the constitution:
To allow voters to vote on constitutional amendments at any time, rather than only alongside general elections.
To convene a Constitutional Convention to revise the constitution.

Both proposals were rejected by voters, with 53.8% and 51.8% against respectively.

Results

Question One

Question Two

References

Palau
1996 in Palau
Referendums in Palau
Constitutional referendums in Palau